The Académie Colarossi (1870–1930) was an art school in Paris founded in 1870 by the Italian model and sculptor Filippo Colarossi. It was originally located on the Île de la Cité, and it moved in 1879 to 10 rue de la Grande-Chaumière in the 6th arrondissement. The school closed in the 1930s.

History 
A precursor art school in the same location was the Académie Suisse, founded in 1815. The former Académie Suisse location on the Île de la Cité was bought by Italian sculptor Filippo Colarossi in 1870, and in 1879 it moved to 10 rue de la Grande-Chaumière in the 6th arrondissement.

The Académie was established in the 19th century as an alternative to the government-sanctioned École des Beaux Arts that had, in the eyes of many promising young artists at the time, become far too conservative. Along with its equivalent Académie Julian, and unlike the official École des Beaux Arts, the Colarossi school accepted female students and allowed them to draw from the nude male model.

Around 1879, two salon painters taught the Académie classes, the Japanese-influenced painter Raphaël Collin and French academic-style painter Gustave Courtois. Among its other instructors were the influential French sculptor, Jean Antoine Injalbert and painter Pascal Dagnan-Bouveret. In 1910, the progressive Académie appointed the New Zealand artist Frances Hodgkins (1869–1947) as its first female teacher.

In 1922 sculptor Henry Moore attended, although not as a student. Moore took life-drawing classes that were open to the general public, paid for with a book of inexpensive tickets. The evening classes were progressively timed – one hour, then 20 minutes, then five minutes, then one – to develop various drawing skills.

The school closed in the 1930s. Around that time, Madame Colarossi burned the priceless school archives in retaliation for her husband's philandering.

Notable students 
At Académie Colarossi among the female attendees were Amedeo Modigliani's muse, Jeanne Hébuterne; Scottish Impressionist Bessie MacNicol; Canadian Impressionist Emily Carr; and French sculptor Camille Claudel, who was also a student of Rodin's. Noted also for its classes in life sculpting, the school attracted many foreign students, including a large number from the United States.

Other students 
 Ethel Blanchard Collver
 Rose Connor
 Gustave-Claude-Etienne Courtois
 Camilo Egas
 Hester Frood
 Paul Haefliger
 Cornelia Ellis Hildebrandt
 Louis Kahan
 Richard E. Miller
 Josephine Muntz Adams
 Maurice Prendergast
 Lucy May Stanton
 Mary K. Trotter
 Clara Westhoff
 George Grosz
 Clara Miller Burd
 Nora Houston

See also

:Category:Académie Colarossi alumni

References

 
Art schools in Paris
History of Paris
Defunct art schools